Steven Kennon Davis (August 4, 1960 – September 28, 2021) was an American professional baseball pitcher who played for three seasons in Major League Baseball. He played for the Toronto Blue Jays from 1985 to 1986 and the Cleveland Indians in 1989.

External links

1960 births
2021 deaths
Albuquerque Dukes players
American expatriate baseball players in Canada
Baseball players from San Antonio
Cleveland Indians players
Colorado Springs Sky Sox players
Florence Blue Jays players
Knoxville Blue Jays players
Major League Baseball pitchers
Medicine Hat Blue Jays players
Syracuse Chiefs players
Toronto Blue Jays players
Texas A&M Aggies baseball players